The fourth season of American talent show competition series America's Got Talent was broadcast on NBC from June 23 to September 16, 2009. Following the previous season, Jerry Springer left the show due to other commitments, and was replaced as host by Nick Cannon. A number of changes were also made to the program before filming commenced, which included replacing the "boot camp" stage with a round similar in format to that used by Britain's Got Talent, and changing the buzzer format to match that being used by the Got Talent franchise. In addition, the episodes for results in each live round of the competition were also modified. They were broadcast over a one-hour period, and would feature performances by guest stars.

The fourth season was won by country singer Kevin Skinner, with opera singer Bárbara Padilla finishing in second, and percussion group Recycled Percussion placing third. During its broadcast, the season averaged around over 11.9 million viewers, and was the first in the program's history to be aired in high definition.

Season overview 

Auditions for the fourth season's competition took place across Winter until mid-Spring 2009, with auditions expanding to more cities. Filming for the audition episodes focused on those held within the cities of New York, Houston, Los Angeles, Chicago, Miami, Tacoma and Seattle. Auditions were also held in Boston, Atlanta, and Washington, D.C. but were not included in the episodes. Prior to auditions taking place, Jerry Springer announced he was unable to continue hosting AGT due to his talk show schedule, in addition to summer theater commitments he had. As a result, the network recruited Nick Cannon to be his successor.

The format for the second stage of auditions changed by removing the "boot camp" portion that had been used in the previous two seasons, in favor of using the selection process from Britain's Got Talent, under the title of "Vegas Verdicts". Instead, judges reviewed the tapes of participants who had made successful auditions, to determine who would advance into the live rounds. This stage would continue to divide participants into groups, allowing the judges to debate among themselves about which group of participants should earn a place in the live rounds, before bringing back each group to inform them of their decision about their progress in the competition. In some cases, participants were required to do a second performance to help the judges make their final decisions. The format for the buzzers in the live rounds was also altered to match that of the format across the Got Talent franchise, in that participants receiving buzzes from all the judges had to stop immediately, rather than being given a little more time to perform.

Two issues arose during this season during the competition. The first was the intervention of executive producer Simon Cowell, who felt "too much talent" had been eliminated during the new "Vegas Verdicts" stage. The judges decided to bring back several of the eliminated acts as Wildcards for the quarter-finals. The second was the judges' inability to determine which two acts they favored and would advance beyond the first semi-final. Eventually they opted to put both through without a vote in the second semi-final.

Forty-eight of the participants who auditioned for this season secured a place in the live quarter-finals (including those originally eliminated in the Vegas Verdicts stage before Cowell's intervention), with twelve quarter-finalists performing in each show. About twenty of these advanced and were split between the two semi-finals, with ten semi-finalists securing a place in the live final, which was a single stage rather than multiple rounds in previous seasons. These are the results of each participant's overall performance during the season:

 |  |  |  | 
 |  Judges' Wildcard Quarter-Finalist

  Ages denoted for a participant(s), pertain to their final performance for this season.
  The ages of Drew Thomas' assistants and Marcus Terrell's backing group were not disclosed during the season's broadcast.

Quarter-finals summary
 Buzzed Out |  Judges' choice | 
 |

Quarter-final 1 (August 4)
Guest Performers, Results Show: Terry Fator and Mariah Carey

Quarter-final 2 (August 11)
Guest Performers, Results Show:  LMFAO and Penn and Teller.

Quarter-final 3 (August 18)
Guest Performers, Results Show: Ashley Tisdale and Daughtry

Quarter-final 4 (August 25)
Guest Performer, Results Show: Reba McEntire

Semi-finals summary
 Buzzed out |

Semi-final 1 (September 1)
Guest Performers, Result Show: Miss Piggy and Kermit the Frog, and David Hasselhoff

  Both acts were advanced into the next stage, after the judges could not decide on who to vote for advancing further in the competition. This decision meant no Judges' Vote was held in the next semi-final.

Semi-final 2 (September 8)
Guest Performer, Results Show: Cast of musical Jersey Boys.

Final (September 14)
Guest Performers, Results Show: Thelma Houston, Shakira, Rascal Flatts, cast members of Cirque Du Soleil, Leona Lewis, and Susan Boyle.

 |  |

Ratings

References

2009 American television seasons
America's Got Talent seasons